Quiet Luke is the music project of New York City based multi-disciplinary artist Alexander Luke Bahta.

Early life 
Bahta was born in Broward County, in a suburb north of Miami, Florida. His mother enrolled him in piano lessons when he was around five years old.

He cites his experiences in choir and his immersion in the craft of beat-making in his teen years as influential to his musical direction. There are mentions of bedroom romanticism in interviews about his work.

He chose the pen name Quiet Luke around the age of 16 as he was gaining interest in Eastern religions. Talking to The Fader in 2016, he said "I liked the idea of sitting in a corner being contemplative, being a better listener than a speaker."

Career 
Bahta premiered his debut single "Where U Were" on The Fader on July 12, 2016 on Mermaid Avenue, a sub-label of Mom + Pop Music. In October of 2016 he released his debut EP, Beholden. He graduated from NYU’s Clive Davis Institute of Recorded Music in 2017. He released his next single "I Wanna Go" and subsequent EP, Your Happy Place, in 2017.

He released his debut album, 21st Century Blue, on December 4, 2019.

Musical style and influences 
In a 2016 interview with Crack Magazine, Quiet Luke cited influences such as Michael Jackson, Antonio Vivaldi, Jimi Hendrix and Sade. In the same interview, Bahta said that his music "[belongs] in the canon of glam, rock in general, P-funk, Japanese aesthetics, and sci-fi". 

In other interviews he has paid homage to Timbaland and the Dada art movement of the 20th century. He has noted "architectural attention to form" as a characteristic of his music and highlighted "understanding humanity in this time of data" as a central question in his practice.

Discography 
Studio albums
 21st Century Blue (2019)

Extended plays
 Beholden (2016)
 Your Happy Place (2017)

References 

American rock singers
American multi-instrumentalists
Songwriters from Florida
Record producers from Florida